Quandre Diggs (born January 22, 1993) is an American football free safety for the Seattle Seahawks of the National Football League (NFL). He played college football at Texas, and was drafted by the Detroit Lions in the sixth round of the 2015 NFL Draft. He played his first two years in the NFL as a cornerback before being moved to safety. In 2019, Diggs was traded to the Seahawks.

High school career
Diggs attended Angleton High School, where he played on the football team. As a member of the Angleton Wildcats, he primarily played cornerback and safety, but occasionally played quarterback on offense.  Considered a four-star recruit by ESPN.com, Diggs was listed as the top-ranked cornerback in the nation in the Class of 2011.

College career
Diggs played college football at Texas from 2011 to 2014 under head coaches Mack Brown (2011–2013) and Charlie Strong (2014). He played in 52 career games, of which he started 49. He was named the Big 12 Conference Defensive Freshman of the Year in 2011. He was named to the Second-team All-Big 12 in 2011 and was named All-Big 12 Honorable Mention in 2013. He ended his collegiate career tied for ninth on the University of Texas all-time interceptions list with 11 and tied for ninth with 37 career pass breakups.

Professional career
On December 1, 2014, it was announced that Diggs would be playing in the Senior Bowl after accepting his invitation. On January 24, 2015, Diggs played in the 2015 Senior Bowl and recorded four solo tackles and an interception as part of Ken Whisenhunt's North team that defeated the South 34–13. He attended the NFL Scouting Combine and completed all of the combine drills. He finished eighth among all participating cornerbacks in the bench press, 12th in the short shuttle, and finished 19th among cornerbacks in the 40-yard dash. On March 24, 2015, Diggs attended Texas's pro day, but opted to stand on the majority of his combine numbers and only performed positional drills and broad jump. He added six inches to his broad jump from the combine (9'11"). At the conclusion of the pre-draft process, Diggs was projected to be a seventh round pick by the majority of NFL draft experts and scouts. He was ranked the 10th best cornerback in the draft by Bleacher Report, was ranked the 21st best cornerback by WalterFootball.com, and was ranked the 30th best cornerback prospect in the draft by DraftScout.com.

The Detroit Lions selected Diggs in the sixth round (200th overall) of the 2015 NFL Draft. He was the 26th cornerback drafted in 2015.

Detroit Lions

2015
On May 7, 2015, the Detroit Lions signed Diggs to a four-year, $2.39 million contract that includes a signing bonus of $115,352.

Throughout training camp, Diggs competed for the role as the first-team nickelback against Bill Bentley, Nevin Lawson, and Mohammed Seisay. Head coach Jim Caldwell named Diggs the backup nickelback, behind Nevin Lawson, to begin the regular season.

He made his professional regular season debut in the Detroit Lions' season-opener at the San Diego Chargers and recorded two solo tackles in their 33–28 loss. Diggs made his first career tackle on Keenan Allen, stopping a five-yard reception in the fourth quarter. On October 23, 2015, Diggs earned his first career start and recorded four combined tackles in their 28–19 loss to the Minnesota Vikings in Week 7. The following week, he was elevated to first-team nickelback replacing Nevin Lawson who was moved to outside cornerback after Rashean Mathis sustained a concussion the previous week. On November 22, 2015, Diggs collected a season-high six combined tackles and a pass deflection in the Lions' 18–13 win against the Oakland Raiders in Week 11. He finished his rookie season with 38 combined tackles (31 solo) and six pass deflections in 16 games and four starts. He finished the season with the 33rd highest overall grade from Pro Football Focus.

2016
Diggs entered training camp slated as the No. 1 nickelback on the depth chart, but saw minor competition from Crezdon Butler. Defensive coordinator Teryl Austin named Diggs the first-team nickelback and third cornerback on the depth chart to start the season, behind Darius Slay and Nevin Lawson.

In Week 6, he collected five solo tackles during a 31–28 victory against the Los Angeles Rams. It was his third consecutive game with five solo tackles. On November 24, 2016, Diggs recorded a season-high six solo tackles in the Lions' 16–13 victory against the Minnesota Vikings in Week 12. On December 6, 2016, the Detroit Lions placed Diggs on injured reserve after he suffered a pectoral injury during a Week 13 victory at the New Orleans Saints. Diggs finished the  season with 44 combined tackles (40 solo) and a pass deflections in 12 games and four starts. He earned an overall grade of 49.5 from Pro Football Focus in 2016 and ranked 95th among the 111 qualifying cornerbacks.

2017
During training camp, Diggs competed to be the starting nickelback against D. J. Hayden and Jamal Agnew. Head coach Jim Caldwell named Diggs the first-team nickelback on and the fifth cornerback on the Lions' depth chart, behind Darius Slay, Nevin Lawson, Teez Tabor, and D.J. Hayden, to start the season.

He started in the Detroit Lions' season-opener against the Arizona Cardinals and made a season-high three pass deflections and three solo tackles in their 35–23 victory. On December 3, 2017, Diggs started his first game as a strong safety and collected five solo tackles and a pass deflection during a 44–20 loss at the Baltimore Ravens in a Week 13. Diggs was named the starter after Tavon Wilson injured his shoulder the previous week and was required to undergo surgery. Defensive coordinator Teryl Austin's decision to start Diggs at strong safety was unexpected as many people assumed backup strong safety Miles Killebrew would be taking over the role. In Week 14, he collected seven combined tackles, deflected a pass, and made his first career interception off a pass by quarterback Jameis Winston during a 24–21 victory at the Tampa Bay Buccaneers. The following week, Diggs made his third consecutive start at safety and recorded three solo tackles, two pass deflections, an interception, and a sack in the Lions' 20–10 win against the Chicago Bears in Week 15. He made his first career sack on quarterback Mitchell Trubisky during the second quarter. On December 24, 2017, Diggs recorded four combined tackles, a pass deflection, and intercepted a pass by Andy Dalton in a 26–17 loss at the Cincinnati Bengals in Week 16. His interception extended his streak to three consecutive games with a pick. He finished the  season with a career-high 55 combined tackles (45 solo), nine pass deflections, three interceptions, and a sack in 16 games and 11 starts. Pro Football Focus gave Diggs an overall grade of 73.5, ranking him 73rd among all qualifying cornerbacks in 2017.

2018
On September 3, 2018, Diggs signed a three-year, $20.4 million contract extension with the Lions.

On September 10, in the season opener on Monday Night Football, Diggs intercepted Sam Darnold's first career pass attempt and returned it 37 yards for a touchdown in a game against the Jets.

Seattle Seahawks

2019
On October 22, 2019, Diggs was traded along with a 7th round pick to the Seattle Seahawks for a fifth round pick in the 2020 NFL Draft.
Diggs made his debut with the Seahawks in week 10 against the San Francisco 49ers on Monday Night Football.  In the game, Diggs recorded an interception off Jimmy Garoppolo which he returned for 44 yards in the 27–24 overtime win. 
In week 12 against the Philadelphia Eagles, Diggs forced a fumble on tight end Dallas Goedert which he recovered in the 17–9 win.  In week 14 against the Los Angeles Rams, he intercepted 2 passes thrown by Jared Goff and returned one for a 55 yard touchdown in the 12–28 loss.

Diggs was named to the Pro Bowl on January 17, 2020, as an alternate.

2020

In Week 1 against the Atlanta Falcons, Diggs intercepted a pass thrown by quarterback Matt Ryan late in the fourth quarter to seal a 38–25 Seahawks' win.
In Week 2 against the New England Patriots on Sunday Night Football, Diggs was ejected from the game after initiating a helmet to helmet hit with Patriots' wide receiver N'Keal Harry.
In Week 7 against the Arizona Cardinals on Sunday Night Football, Diggs recorded an interception off a pass thrown by Kyler Murray during the 37–34 overtime loss.
In Week 12 against the Philadelphia Eagles on Monday Night Football, Diggs intercepted a pass thrown by Carson Wentz in the end zone during the 23–17 win.

Diggs was named to the Pro Bowl on December 21, 2020, as the NFC starter at free safety. Diggs and teammate Jamal Adams became the first safety tandem to make the Pro Bowl together since former Seahawks safeties Earl Thomas and Kam Chancellor in 2015.
In Week 16 against the Los Angeles Rams, Diggs recorded his fifth interception of the season off a pass thrown by Jared Goff during the 20–9 win.

2021
Earlier in the NFL preseason, On May 17, 2021, Diggs has announced that he would change his number 37 to number 6, per the new NFL jersey rule. In Week 18 of the 2021 regular season, Diggs suffered a dislocated ankle and a broken right fibula in the 38-30 win against the Arizona Cardinals.

2022
On March 14, 2022, Diggs signed a three-year, $40 million extension with the Seahawks.

In Week 18, Diggs had four tackles and an overtime interception that led to a game-winning field goal in a 19-16 win over the Rams, earning NFC Defensive Player of the Week.

NFL career statistics

Personal life
Diggs is the younger half-brother of former Longhorns and NFL defensive back Quentin Jammer.

References

External links
Seattle Seahawks bio

1993 births
Living people
American football cornerbacks
American football safeties
Detroit Lions players
People from Angleton, Texas
Players of American football from Texas
Seattle Seahawks players
Sportspeople from the Houston metropolitan area
Texas Longhorns football players
National Conference Pro Bowl players
Ed Block Courage Award recipients